Cardinal Newman Catholic School is a Roman Catholic Academy that caters for pupils aged between 11 and 18, located in the Warden Hills area of Bedfordshire, England. Opened in September 1968, the current head is Andrew Bull, with the deputy heads being Fleur Musonda and Lucy Whelan. There are currently over 1500 students on roll. The school is named after a cardinal of the Roman Catholic Church, John Henry Newman.

As the only Roman Catholic secondary school in the whole of Luton, the school is constantly oversubscribed with over 400 applicants yearly, yet with 270 places to offer. Cardinal Newman was the only secondary school in Luton to have its own sixth form until 2011 when Stockwood Park Academy (then Barnfield South Academy) launched a sixth form. Its sixth form has over 150 places to offer students from both inside and outside the school.

Specialisms and academy status

The school has previously acquired Specialist Science Status with Mathematics. This award has given the school funding to build and complete a new sixth form and science block extension, install a new computer and server network across the whole school, install brand new equipment including SMART Boards in many classrooms, purchase new equipment in many departments, especially in maths and science and the renovation of certain areas of the school site including the PE block. Despite the specialist schools programme ending, the school continues to offer science and mathematics as specialisms.

Previously a voluntary aided school, in September 2015 Cardinal Newman Catholic School converted to academy status.

Ofsted report
Its last Ofsted report gave the school excellent feedback, including talking about the 'good quality of the teaching in lessons' and the 'very good management and leadership in the school'. Main areas for improvement included the ICT provision and the induction process of new students. These areas and others, are currently being addressed and substantially improved with the help of funding and support from the feeder schools and the board of governors.

Notable former pupils
There have been several famous people that have attended Cardinal Newman and this includes:
 Janoi Donacien, left back at Accrington Stanley F.C., and ex-footballer at Aston Villa
 Cliff McNish, author
 Kevin Blackwell, ex Luton Town Football Club manager
 Kingsley Black, ex Luton Town Football Club player
 Gary Doherty has played for Tottenham Hotspur F.C. and is currently at Charlton Athletic F.C. football club
 Kevin Foley, footballer
 Liam George, footballer
 Keith Keane, currently plays for Preston North End Football Club
 Conor Travers, the youngest Countdown champion winning at the age of 14 years studied for his GCSEs and then moved to do his A Levels at Luton Sixth Form College

References

External links
 Official website
 Ofsted inspection results
 School profile on BBC News

Secondary schools in Luton
Further education in Luton
Educational institutions established in 1968
Catholic secondary schools in the Diocese of Northampton
1968 establishments in England
Academies in Luton